Kurovo is a rural locality (a village) in Zheleznodorozhnoye Rural Settlement, Sheksninsky District, Vologda Oblast, Russia. The population was 1 as of 2002.

Geography 
Kurovo is located 19 km west of Sheksna (the district's administrative centre) by road. Sokolovo is the nearest rural locality.

References 

Rural localities in Sheksninsky District